Jeffrey Whitefoot (born 31 December 1933) is an English former footballer who played as a wing half in the Football League for Manchester United, Grimsby Town and Nottingham Forest. He was capped by England at under-23 level in 1954.

Whitefoot started his career as a trainee with Manchester United in 1949. When he made his debut against Portsmouth in April 1950 he was at the time the youngest player to start in a League match for United at 16 years and 105 days. In eight seasons at United, he made 95 appearances in all competitions and was a member of the 1952 and 1956 title-winning sides, although he never scored a goal for them. He left the club for Grimsby Town in 1957, but returned to the First Division to sign for Nottingham Forest a year later, and helped them win the FA Cup in 1959. He stayed at the City Ground until his retirement as a player at the end of the 1966-67 season, when Forest finished second behind Manchester United in the league - at the time, this was the closest Forest had come to winning the league title.

After Billy Gray's death on 11 April 2011, Whitefoot is now the only surviving member of the 1959 FA Cup winning team.

The death of Bill Foulkes on 25 November 2013 also means that Whitefoot is the last player still living to have collected a league title winner's medal with Manchester United in the 1955-56 season, having played 15 times in the league that season. However, seven of the United players who qualified for a championship medal that season lost their lives as a result of the Munich air disaster on 6 February 1958, including Eddie Colman, the player who ousted Whitefoot as the club's regular right-half during that season.

After leaving football, Whitefoot ran pubs in East Leake and Oakham. He has been called "the last of the Busby Babes".

References

1933 births
Living people
People from Cheadle, Greater Manchester
English footballers
England under-23 international footballers
Association football midfielders
Manchester United F.C. players
Grimsby Town F.C. players
Nottingham Forest F.C. players
English Football League players
FA Cup Final players